Ballybricken is an area in the east of County Limerick in Ireland. It is in the civil parish of Caherelly, approximately 18 kilometres (11 miles) from Limerick city. Ballybricken is mainly a farming area.

Sport
Ballybricken's local GAA club, officially named Ballybricken/Bohermore GAA Club, has its grounds in the area. A new clubhouse was officially opened on the May Bank Holiday weekend in 2008. The Ballybricken/Bohermore GAA senior teams play at a Junior A level in both hurling and football.

Community
Ballybricken has a shop/post office and pub (Kirby's "Hunting Lodge"). Other businesses located in Ballybricken include Mr Binman and Tucon Engineering Company Ltd.

Dolores O'Riordan from The Cranberries was brought up in Ballybricken and went to the local primary school.

References

External links
Ballybricken GAA

Towns and villages in County Limerick